Miami-Dade County is a county located in the southeastern part of the U.S. state of Florida. The county had a population of 2,701,767 as of the 2020 census, making it the most populous county in Florida and the seventh-most populous county in the United States. The county seat is Miami, the core of the nation's ninth largest and world's 34th largest metropolitan area with a 2020 population of 6.138 million people, exceeding the population of 31 of the nation's 50 states as of 2022.

As of 2021, Miami-Dade County has a gross domestic product of $154.9 billion, making it the 14th-largest of the nation's 3,033 counties. The county is home to the Port of Miami on Biscayne Bay, the world's largest passenger port with a world record 5.5 million passengers in 2018, and Miami International Airport, the third largest U.S. airport for international passengers and largest U.S. airport for international cargo. The county's land area of nearly 2,000 square miles exceeds that of two U.S. states, Delaware and Rhode Island. The county is home to several universities and colleges, including the University of Miami in Coral Gables, a private research university that is routinely ranked as one of the nation's top universities and is the county's second largest employer with nearly 17,000 employees as of 2021.

Miami-Dade County is heavily Hispanic and was the most populous majority-Hispanic county in the nation as of 2020. It is home to 34 incorporated cities and many unincorporated areas. The northern, central and eastern portions of the county are heavily urbanized with many high-rise buildings along the coastline, including Miami's Central Business District in Downtown Miami. Southern Miami-Dade County includes the Redland and Homestead areas, which make up the agricultural economy of the county. Agricultural Redland makes up roughly one third of Miami-Dade County's inhabited land area, and is sparsely populated, a stark contrast to the densely populated, urban portions of the county northern sections.

The county includes portions of two national parks. To the west, the county extends into the Everglades National Park and is populated only by a Miccosukee tribal village. Biscayne National Park and the Biscayne Bay Aquatic Preserves are located east of the mainland in Biscayne Bay.

History

Native people
The earliest evidence of Native American settlement in the Miami region came from about 12,000 years ago. The first inhabitants settled on the banks of the Miami River, with the main villages on the northern banks.

The inhabitants at the time of first European contact were the Tequesta people, who controlled much of southeastern Florida, including what is now Miami-Dade County, Broward County, and the southern part of Palm Beach County. The Tequesta Indians fished, hunted, and gathered the fruit and roots of plants for food, but did not practice agriculture. They buried the small bones of the deceased with the rest of the body, and put the larger bones in a box for the village people to see. The Tequesta are credited with making the Miami Circle.

European explorers and settlers
Juan Ponce de León was the first European to visit the area in 1513 by sailing into Biscayne Bay. His journal records he reached Chequescha, a variant of Tequesta, which was Miami's first recorded name. It is unknown whether he came ashore or made contact with the natives. Pedro Menéndez de Avilés and his men made the first recorded landing when they visited the Tequesta settlement in 1566 while looking for Avilés' missing son, shipwrecked a year earlier. Spanish soldiers led by Father Francisco Villarreal built a Jesuit mission at the mouth of the Miami River a year later but it was short-lived. After the Spaniards left, the Tequesta Indians were left to fend themselves from European-introduced diseases like smallpox. By 1711, the Tequesta sent a couple of local chiefs to Havana, Cuba, to ask if they could migrate there. The Cubans sent two ships to help them, but Spanish illnesses struck and most of the Tequesta died.

The first permanent European settlers arrived in the early 19th century. People came from the Bahamas to South Florida and the Keys to hunt for treasure from the ships that ran aground on the treacherous Great Florida Reef. Some accepted Spanish land offers along the Miami River. At about the same time, the Seminole Indians arrived, along with a group of runaway slaves. The area was affected by the Second Seminole War, during which Major William S. Harney led several raids against the Indians. Most non-Indian residents were soldiers stationed at Fort Dallas. It was the most devastating Indian war in American history, causing almost a total loss of population in Miami.

After the Second Seminole War ended in 1842, William English re-established a plantation started by his uncle on the Miami River. He charted the "Village of Miami" on the south bank of the Miami River and sold several plots of land. In 1844, Miami became the county seat, and six years later a census reported there were ninety-six residents in the area. The Third Seminole War was not as destructive as the second, but it slowed the settlement of southeast Florida. At the end of the war, a few of the soldiers stayed.

Establishment

Dade County was created on January 18, 1836, under the Territorial Act of the United States. The county was named after Major Francis L. Dade, a soldier killed in 1835 in the Second Seminole War, at what has since been named the Dade Battlefield. At the time of its creation, Dade County included the land that now contains Palm Beach and Broward counties, together with the Florida Keys from Bahia Honda Key north and the land of present-day Miami-Dade County. The county seat was originally at Indian Key in the Florida Keys; then in 1844, the County seat was moved to Miami. The Florida Keys from Key Largo to Bahia Honda were returned to Monroe County in 1866. In 1888 the county seat was moved to Juno, near present-day Juno Beach, Florida, returning to Miami in 1899. In 1909, Palm Beach County was formed from the northern portion of what was Dade County, and then in 1915, Palm Beach County and Dade County contributed nearly equal portions of land to create what is now Broward County. There have been no significant boundary changes to the county since 1915.

Hurricanes
The third-costliest natural disaster to occur in the United States was Hurricane Andrew, which hit Miami in the early morning of Monday, August 24, 1992. It struck the southern part of the county from due east, south of Miami and very near Homestead, Kendall, and Cutler Ridge (now the Town of Cutler Bay). Damages numbered over US$25 billion in the county alone, and recovery has taken years in these areas where the destruction was greatest. This was the costliest natural disaster in US history until Hurricane Katrina struck the Gulf region in 2005.

Name change
On November 13, 1997, voters changed the name of the county from Dade to Miami-Dade to acknowledge the international name recognition of Miami. Voters were acting pursuant to home rule powers granted to Dade County, including the ability to change the name of the county without the consent of the Florida Legislature. The change in name also addressed a source of public dissatisfaction with the name "Dade" which was chosen to honor Francis L. Dade, who had been killed in the Dade battle in the 1830s. The massacre did not occur in South Florida, but in the west central part of the state, in present-day Sumter County, near Bushnell. There is also a Dade City, which is closer to the site of the massacre.

Miami-Dade is the only hyphenated county name in the United States (although Alaska's Matanuska-Susitna Borough is similarly adorned).

Geography

It is the third-largest county in Florida by land area and second-largest by total area. Most of the water is in the Biscayne Bay, with another significant portion in the adjacent Atlantic Ocean.

It is rather new geologically and is at the eastern edge of the Florida Platform, a carbonate plateau created millions of years ago. Eastern Dade is composed of Oolite limestone while western Dade is composed mostly of Bryozoa. Miami-Dade is among the last areas of Florida to be created and populated with fauna and flora, mostly in the Pleistocene.

The bay is divided from the Atlantic Ocean by many barrier islands along the coast. The city of Miami Beach, home to the South Beach neighborhood and its Art Deco district, is built on these barrier islands. The archipelago of the Florida Keys, which extends in an arc to the south-southwest, is only accessible through Miami-Dade County, although most of the Keys are part of neighboring Monroe County. Miami is 68 miles from West Palm Beach, and 30 miles from Fort Lauderdale.

Communities

Miami-Dade County includes 34 incorporated areas, 38 census-designated places, and 16 unincorporated regions.

Adjacent counties
 Broward County – north
 Monroe County – southwest
 Collier County – northwest

National protected areas
 Big Cypress National Preserve
 Biscayne National Park
 Everglades National Park

Demographics

2020 U.S. Census

As of the 2020 United States census, there were 2,701,767 people, 912,805 households, and 633,834 families residing in the county.

2010 U.S. Census

U.S. Census Bureau 2010 ethnic/race demographics:
 Hispanic or Latino of any race: 65.0%
 White (non-Hispanic): 15.4% (White total 73.8% when including White Hispanics)
 Black (non-Hispanic): 17.1% (Black total 18.9% when including Black Hispanics)
 Asian: 1.5%
 Two or more races: 2.4%
 American Indian and Alaska Native: 0.2%
 Native Hawaiian and Other Pacific Islander: <0.1%
 Other Races: 3.2% (0.6% Arab)

In 2010, the largest ancestry groups were:

 34.3% Cuban
 4.6% Colombian
 4.5% Haitian
 4.2% Nicaraguan
 3.7% Puerto Rican
 3.4% American
 2.3% Dominican
 2.3% German
 2.2% Italian
 2.2% Honduran
 2.1% Mexican
 1.9% Venezuelan
 1.8% Irish
 1.6% Peruvian
 1.5% English
 1.4% Jamaican
 1.1% Argentine
 1.0% Russian

In 2010, Cubans made up the largest population of immigrants (with more than half of the population) with Colombians coming in second, Haitians in third, followed by Nicaraguans in fourth place, then Dominicans, Venezuelans, Peruvians, Jamaicans, Mexicans, and Argentinians among the highest group of immigrants.

Miami-Dade has small communities of Brazilians, Portuguese, Spaniards, Ukrainians and Poles along with Canadians (including Francophone from the province of Quebec), French, Germans, other Europeans, British expatriates and Israelis.

There were 867,352 households, out of which 30.6% had children under the age of 18 living with them, 43.8% were married couples living together, 18.8% had a female householder with no husband present, and 30.5% were non-families. 23.6% of all households were made up of individuals, and 8.4% (2.5% male and 5.9% female) had someone living alone who was 65 years of age or older. The average household size was 2.83 and the average family size was 3.33.

The age distribution is 21.9% under the age of 18, 9.9% from 18 to 24, 28.6% from 25 to 44, 25.6% from 45 to 64, and 14.1% who were 65 years of age or older. The median age was 38.2 years. For every 100 females, there were 93.8 males. For every 100 females age 18 and over, there were 91.0 males.

The median income for a household in the county was $43,605, and the median income for a family was $50,065. Males had a median income of $35,096 versus $29,980 for females. The per capita income for the county was $22,957. About 13.8% of families and 17.2% of the population were below the poverty line, including 22.0% of those under age 18 and 22.1% of those aged 65 or over.

In 2010, 51.1% of the county's population was foreign born, with 48.7% being naturalized American citizens. Of foreign-born residents, 93.0% were born in Latin America, 3.2% were born in Europe, 2.7% born in Asia, 0.5% born in Africa, 0.5% in North America, and 0.1% were born in Oceania.

2000 U.S. Census

The county's racial makeup was 69.7% White (49% White Hispanic, 20.7% Non-Hispanic White), 20.3% African American and Black (with a large part of Caribbean descent), 0.2% Native American, 1.4% Asian, <0.1% Pacific Islander, 4.60% from other races, and 3.8% from two or more races. 57.3% of the population were Hispanic or Latino of any race. In relation to ancestry (excluding the various Hispanic and Latino ancestries), 5% were Haitian, 5% American, 2% Italian, 2% Jamaican, 2% German, 2% Irish, and 2% English ancestry.

There were 776,774 households, out of which 33.8% had children under the age of 18 living with them, 47.7% were married couples living together, 17.2% had a female householder with no husband present, and 29.4% were non-families. 23.3% of all households were made up of individuals, and 8.6% had someone living alone who was 65 years of age or older. The average household size was 2.84 and the average family size was 3.35.

The age distribution is 24.8% under the age of 18, 9.1% from 18 to 24, 31.0% from 25 to 44, 21.7% from 45 to 64, and 13.3% who were 65 years of age or older. The median age was 36 years. For every 100 females, there were 93.5 males. For every 100 females age 18 and over, there were 90.2 males.

The county's median household income was $35,966, and the median family income was $40,260. Males had a median income of $30,120 versus $24,686 for females. The county's per capita income was $18,497. About 14.5% of families and 18.0% of the population were below the poverty line, including 22.9% of those under age 18 and 18.9% of those age 65 or over.

Languages
As of 2010, 28.1% of the population spoke only English at home, while 63.8% of the population spoke Spanish, 4.2% spoke French Creole (mainly Haitian Creole), 0.6% French, and 0.6% Portuguese. About 52% of the county residents were born outside the United States, while 71.9% of the population spoke a language other than English at home.

Religious statistics
In 2010 statistics, the largest religious group in Miami-Dade County was the Archdiocese of Miami with 544,449 Catholics in 65 parishes, followed by 96,749 non-denominational adherents with 197 congregations, 80,123 SBC Baptists with 313 congregations, 47,921 NBC Baptists with 44 congregations, 27,901 Seventh-day Adventists in 62 congregations, 25,244 AoG Pentecostals with 45 congregations, 14,628 LDS Mormons with 18 congregations, 12,569 TEC Episcopalians with 30 congregations, and 11,880 UMC Methodists with 32 congregations. There is an estimated 23,064 Muslims with 15 congregations, 3,069 Hindus with 20 congregations, and 1,342 Buddhist with 22 congregations.

In 2005 the Jewish population of the county has decreased but stabilized at about 121,000 with a high percentage of retired and elderly persons (but less than in Broward and Palm Beach counties). There are more than 60 congregations, 34 Jewish educational institutions, and three Jewish community centers. The highest percentage and increase in Jewish population is in North Dade, especially in Aventura. Miami-Dade County hosts Florida's third largest Jewish population and the nation's tenth largest.

Altogether, 39.8% of the population was claimed as members by religious congregations, although members of historically African-American denominations were underrepresented due to incomplete information. In 2014, Miami-Dade County had 731 religious organizations, the 14th most out of all US counties.

Law, government, and politics

Miami-Dade County has operated under a metropolitan system of government, a "two-tier federation", since 1957. This was made possible when Florida voters approved a constitutional amendment in 1956 that allowed the people of Dade County (as it was known) to enact a home rule charter. Prior to this year, home rule did not exist in Florida, and all counties were limited to the same set of powers by the Florida Constitution and state law.

Unlike a consolidated city-county, where the city and county governments merge into a single entity, these two entities are separate. Instead there are two "tiers", or levels, of government: city and county. There are 34 municipalities in the county, the City of Miami being the largest.

Cities are the "lower tier" of local government, providing police and fire protection, zoning and code enforcement, and other typical city services within their jurisdiction. These services are paid for by city taxes. The County is the "upper tier", and it provides services of a metropolitan nature, such as emergency management, airport and seaport operations, public housing and health care services, transportation, environmental services, solid waste disposal etc. These are funded by county taxes, which are assessed on all incorporated and unincorporated areas.

Of the county's 2.6 million total residents (as of 2013), approximately 52% live in unincorporated areas, the majority of which are heavily suburbanized. These residents are part of the Unincorporated Municipal Services Area (UMSA). For these residents, the County fills the role of both lower- and upper-tier government, the County Commission acting as their lower-tier municipal representative body. Residents within UMSA pay a UMSA tax, equivalent to a city tax, which is used to provide County residents with equivalent city services (police, fire, zoning, water and sewer, etc.). Residents of incorporated areas do not pay UMSA tax.

Structure of county government

The Mayor of Miami-Dade County is elected countywide to serve a four-year term and is considered a "strong mayor". The mayor is not a member of the County Commission, appoints all 25 directors who oversee the operations of the County Departments and has veto power over the Commission. A mayoral appointment and veto can only be overridden by a two-thirds majority of the County Commission. The post is occupied by Daniella Levine Cava, the county’s first female mayor.

The Board of County Commissioners is the legislative body, consisting of 13 members elected from single-member districts. Members are elected to serve four-year terms, and elections of members are staggered. The Board chooses a Chairperson, who presides over the Commission, as well as appoints the members of its legislative committees. The Board has a wide array of powers to enact legislation, create departments, and regulate businesses operating within the County. It also has the power to override the Mayor's veto with a two-thirds vote.

Florida's Constitution provides for five elected officials to oversee executive and administrative functions for each county (called "Constitutional Officers"): Sheriff, Property Appraiser, Supervisor of Elections, Tax Collector, and Clerk of the Circuit Court (also functions as Comptroller). However, the Constitution allows voters in home-rule counties (including Miami-Dade) to abolish the offices and reorganize them as subordinate County departments; Miami-Dade voters chose this option for Sheriff, Supervisor of Elections, and Tax Collector. The offices of Clerk of the Circuit Court, State Attorney, and Public Defender are still branches of State government and are, therefore, independently elected and not part of County government.

Miami-Dade is the only county in Florida that does not have an elected sheriff or a "Sheriff's Office". Instead, the county's law enforcement agency is known as the Miami-Dade Police Department, and its leader is known as the Metropolitan Sheriff and Director of the Miami-Dade Police Department; Nonetheless, Miami-Dade Police badges bear the inscription, "Deputy Sheriff, Sheriff's Office, Dade County, Fla."

Politics

Overview
Miami-Dade County has voted for the Democratic Party candidate in most of the presidential elections in the past four decades, and has gone Democratic in every election since 1992. However, it did vote twice for Ronald Reagan (1980, 1984) and once for George H. W. Bush (1988). From 1904 to 1972 it supported the Democratic candidate in all but four elections. The Democrats had expanded their winning margin in each of the three elections from 2008 to 2016; in 2008 and 2012, Democrat Barack Obama averaged 59.69% of the vote. In 2016, Democrat Hillary Clinton won 63.22% of the vote. However, in 2020, Democrat Joe Biden only won 53.31% of the vote, winning the county by just over seven percent over Republican Donald Trump. This was attributed to a large swing of Cuban Americans, Venezuelan Americans, and other Hispanic Americans to the Republican Party, resulting in the best Republican performance since 2004. In the 2022 gubernatorial and U.S. Senate elections, Republicans Ron DeSantis and Marco Rubio respectively won the county. DeSantis became the first Republican Governor to win Miami-Dade since Jeb Bush in 2002. Rubio won the county for the second time, following his victory in 2010.

Miami-Dade County is represented in the United States House of Representatives by Republicans Maria Elvira Salazar, Carlos Gimenez and Mario Diaz-Balart of the 27th, 28th and 26th districts, and Democrats Frederica Wilson and Debbie Wasserman Schultz of the 24th and 25th districts.

Voter registration

Economy

Brightstar Corporation, Burger King, Intradeco Holdings, Latin Flavors, Norwegian Cruise Line, and Ryder have their headquarters in unincorporated areas in the county. Centurion Air Cargo, Florida West International Airways, IBC Airways, and World Atlantic Airlines have their headquarters on the grounds of Miami International Airport in an unincorporated area in the county.

Hewlett Packard's main Latin America offices are on the ninth floor of the Waterford Building in unincorporated Miami-Dade County.

Other companies with offices in an unincorporated area not in any CDP:
 AstraZeneca's Latin American headquarters
 Gate Group's Latin American headquarters
 Unicomer Group's United States offices
 Goya Foods's Miami office

Several defunct airlines, including Airlift International, Arrow Air, National Airlines, and Rich International Airways, were headquartered on or near the airport property.

After Frank Borman became president of Eastern Airlines in 1975, he moved Eastern's headquarters from Rockefeller Center in Midtown Manhattan, New York City to an unincorporated area in Miami-Dade County Around 1991 the Miami-Dade County lost a few corporations, including Eastern Airlines, which folded in 1991.

At one time the cruise line ResidenSea had its headquarters in an unincorporated area in the county.

Top private employers
According to Miami's Beacon Council, the top private employers in 2014 in Miami-Dade were:

Top government employers
According to Miami's Beacon Council, the top government employers in 2014 in the county were:

Agriculture
Most of the state's summer okra (Abelmoschus esculentus) is grown here, totalling  over the whole year. It is grown as a "scavenger crop", one grown to scavenge the benefits of residual fumigant and fertilizer. The most problematic pest is the Melon Thrips (Thrips palmi) but aphids are also significant. Although the Silverleaf Whitefly (Sweet Potato Whitefly, Bemisia tabaci) reproduces in large numbers on this crop, the plant is not seriously harmed and the feeding damage is quickly repaired. This does still leave okra as a problematic refuge from which SLW will migrate, to nearby tomato, bean, and ornamentals. The University of Florida provides a production handbook which recommends disease management and weed management practices.

Methyl bromide (MB) has been phased out and Telone products  fumigants  are heavily regulated here. M-D much more heavily regulates Telone than the rest of the state does. Therefore the best MB alternatives here are either metam sodium or metam potassium, both combined with chloropicrin.

M-D has some of the lowest Cry 1F resistance in the country. Despite its high volume of cargo traffic with Puerto Rico and earlier speculation, none of PR's extreme Cry1F-r genetics seems to have spread to this area. Southern Florida in general has the lowest in the country (including PR).

The state's first invasion of the Peach Fruit Fly (Bactrocera zonata) began here. An adult male PFF was found on November 10th, 2010 on a guava tree (Psidium guajava).

The Little Fire Ant (Wasmannia auropunctata) is an invasive agricultural pest here. In fact the first recorded invasion of the state was in 1924 in Coconut Grove (which was then near Miami and has since been incorporated into the city).

M-D has the largest greenhousing/nursery industry in the state, but on the other hand produces very little of its own livestock.

Public services

Fire rescue

The Miami-Dade County Fire Rescue Department is the agency that provides fire protection and emergency medical services for Miami-Dade County, Florida. The department serves 29 municipalities and all unincorporated areas of Miami-Dade County from 60 fire stations. The Department also provides fire protection services for Miami International Airport, Miami Executive Airport and Opa-locka Airport.

The communities served are Aventura, Bal Harbour, Bay Harbor Islands, Biscayne Park, Cutler Bay, Doral, El Portal, Florida City, Golden Beach, Hialeah Gardens, Homestead, Indian Creek, Medley, Miami Gardens, Miami Lakes, Miami Shores, Miami Springs, North Bay Village, North Miami, North Miami Beach, Opa-locka, Palmetto Bay, Pinecrest, South Miami, Surfside, Sweetwater, Sunny Isles Beach, Virginia Gardens, and West Miami.

Miami-Dade Fire Rescue is also the home to Urban Search and Rescue Florida Task Force 1 as well as EMS operations consisting of 57 Advanced Life Support units staffed by 760 state-certified paramedics and 640 state-certified emergency medical technicians.

Police department

The Miami-Dade Police Department is a full-service metropolitan police department serving Miami-Dade County's unincorporated areas, although it has lenient mutual aid agreements with other municipalities, most often the City of Miami Police Department. With 4,700 employees, it is Florida's largest police department. The Department is often referred to by its former name, the Metro-Dade Police or simply Metro.

The Miami-Dade Police Department operates out of nine districts throughout the county and has two special bureaus. The director of the department is Juan Perez, who succeeded J.D. Patterson, Jr. The Department's headquarters are in Doral, Florida.

Water and sewer department
Miami-Dade Water and Sewer Department (MDWASD) is one of the largest public utilities in the United States, employing approximately 2,700 employees as of 2007. It provides service to over 2.4 million customers, operating with an annual budget of almost $400 million. Approximately 330 million gallons of water are drawn every day from the Biscayne Aquifer for consumer use. Miami-Dade County is also in the jurisdiction of the South Dade Soil and Water Conservation District.

Corrections department
Miami-Dade County Corrections and Rehabilitation Department is the correction agency.

Aviation department
The Miami-Dade Aviation Department (MDAD) operates Miami International Airport, Miami Executive Airport, Opa-locka Executive Airport, Homestead General Aviation Airport, and Dade-Collier Training and Transition Airport.

County representation
The Florida Department of Juvenile Justice operates the Miami-Dade Regional Juvenile Detention Center in an unincorporated area in the county.

Public libraries

The Miami-Dade Public Library System traces its origin to the late nineteenth century. The first library was a reading room established in Lemon City on April 7, 1894 by the Lemon City Library and Improvement Association. In 1942 neighborhood libraries were brought together in a single public library system, governed by a Board of Trustees and administered by a Head Librarian. A new central library building had been proposed for Bayfront Park in Downtown Miami as early as 1938, but the proposal was not realized till over a decade later. In December 1965 the City of Miami and Metropolitan Dade County agreed that the City of Miami would provide public library service to unincorporated Dade County and to those municipalities that did not provide their library service with four bookmobiles provided library service to the unincorporated area. On November 1, 1971, the City of Miami transferred its library system to Metropolitan Dade County which created a new Department of Libraries with a Director reporting directly to the County Manager.

On November 7, 1972, Dade County voters approved a referendum, also known as the "Decade of Progress" bonds, authorized approximately $553 million for public improvement projects in Dade County. Of that amount, approximately $34.7 million was authorized for public libraries, including construction, renovation, land acquisition, furnishings, and equipment. Between 1976 and 1990, this bond issue provided the funds to open 14 new libraries. On August 24, 1992, Hurricane Andrew inflicted significant damage on the library system, destroying all branches south of Kendall Drive. Over the next years, no further expansion of the system was funded and no new libraries opened. It wasn’t until the fall of 2001, when Mayor Alex Penelas and Board of County Commissioners voted to increase the library system’s budget which provided funding for capital improvement initiatives—making way for the opening of 18 new libraries by 2011. As of 2017, 15 of these libraries have been opened, with the remaining 3 still under construction.

Today Miami-Dade Public Library System serves a population of 2,496,435, provides services for the Miami-Dade County except for the cities of Bal Harbour, Hialeah, Homestead, Miami Shores, North Miami, North Miami Beach and Surfside. It has forty-nine branches, two bookmobiles and one technobus. The Miami-Dade County Board of County Commissioners governs the Miami-Dade Public Library System.

Education

Colleges and universities
The University of Miami, located in Coral Gables, is among the top-tier research universities in the United States, and is the highest ranked private university in Florida.

As of 2020, Florida International University, located in Westchester (in the University Park area), is the fifth largest university by enrollment in the United States. Miami Dade College, located in Miami, has the second largest undergraduate enrollment of any U.S. college or university with over 100,000 students.

A full list of colleges and universities:

 University of Miami (private)
 Florida International University (public)
 Miami Dade College (public)
 Barry University (private/Catholic)
 Nova Southeastern University (private)
 Florida National University (private)
 Florida Memorial University (private/historically black)
 St. Thomas University (private/Catholic)
 Johnson & Wales University (private)
 Carlos Albizu University (private)
 Miami International University of Art & Design (private)
 Yeshiva V'Kollel Beis Moshe Chaim (private/Jewish)
 Miami Ad School (private)
Southeastern College (private)

Primary and secondary (K-12) schools
In Florida, each county is also a school district, and Miami-Dade County Public Schools is such for the county. The district is operated by an independently elected School Board. A professional Superintendent of Schools appointed by the School Board manages the district's day-to-day operations. , the Miami-Dade County Public School District is the fourth-largest public school district in the nation with almost 360,000 students.

The Miami-Dade Public Library is one of the country's largest public library systems. It has 50 branch locations and others under construction.

Miami-Dade County is home to many private and public primary and secondary schools.

 MDCPS public

 American
 Braddock
 Carol City
 Central
 Coral Gables
 Coral Park
 Cutler Bay
 Edison
 Ferguson
 Goleman
 Hialeah
 Hialeah Gardens
 Hialeah-Miami Lakes
 Homestead
 Jackson
 Killian
 Krop
 Miami
 Miami Beach
 Miami Springs
 Mourning
 Norland
 North Miami
 North Miami Beach
 Northwestern
 Palmetto
 Reagan/Doral
 South Dade
 South Miami
 Southridge
 Southwest Miami
 Sunset
 Varela
 Westland
 Washington
 Coral Reef
 DASH
 Martí MAST
 MAST Academy
 MAST @ FIU
 MAST @ Homestead
 Miami Lakes Ed Ctr
 New World
 Robert Morgan
 School for Advanced Studies
 Turner Tech
 TERRA ERI
 Young Men's Prep
 Young Women's Prep

Charter
 Don Soffer Aventura High School
 Sports Leadership and Management Charter School

Tribal
 Miccosukee Indian School (affiliated with the Bureau of Indian Education)

Private
 Allison Academy School
 Carrollton School of the Sacred Heart
 The Cushman School
 Gulliver Schools
 Monsignor Edward Pace High School (Catholic)
 Ransom Everglades School
 Riviera Schools
 Palmer Trinity School

Sites of interest

Museums
 Bass Museum of Art, Miami Beach
 Coral Castle, Homestead Miami
 Coral Gables Police and Fire Station, Coral Gables
 Fairchild Tropical Botanic Garden, Coral Gables
 Frost Art Museum, (Florida International University, Miami)
 Gold Coast Railroad Museum, Miami
 HistoryMiami, Downtown Miami
 Holocaust Memorial, Miami Beach
 Jewish Museum of Florida, Miami Beach
 Lowe Art Museum, (University of Miami, Coral Gables)
 Miami Children's Museum, Miami
 Museum of Contemporary Art, North Miami
 Pérez Art Museum Miami, Miami
 Phillip and Patricia Frost Museum of Science, Miami
 Vizcaya Museum and Gardens, Miami
 Wings Over Miami Museum, Miami
 Wolfsonian, (Florida International University, Miami Beach)

Culture and wildlife

 Adrienne Arsht Center for the Performing Arts, Downtown Miami
 Ancient Spanish Monastery, North Miami Beach
 Bayfront Park Amphitheatre, Downtown Miami
 Bayside Marketplace, Downtown Miami
 Colony Theatre, Miami Beach
 Florida Grand Opera, Miami
 Gusman Center for the Performing Arts, Downtown Miami
 Jungle Island, Miami
 Miami New Drama, Miami Beach
 Miami Seaquarium, Miami
 Monkey Jungle, Miami
 Vizcaya Museum and Gardens, Miami
 Wertheim Performing Arts Center, (Florida International University, Miami)
 Zoo Miami, Miami

Other areas and attractions

Parks

Sports venues

Miami-Dade County holds the majority of sports arenas, stadiums and complexes in South Florida. Some of these sports facilities are:
 Hard Rock Stadium – Miami Dolphins (football) and plays host to the Miami Hurricanes football team during their regular season.
 LoanDepot Park – Miami Marlins (baseball)
 Miami-Dade Arena (formerly American Airlines Arena) – Miami Heat (basketball)
 Tennis Center at Crandon Park – Sony Ericcson Open
 Riccardo Silva Stadium – FIU Panthers (football)
 Ocean Bank Convocation Center – FIU Panthers (basketball)
 Infinity Insurance Park – FIU Panthers (baseball)
 Watsco Center – Miami Hurricanes (basketball)
 Alex Rodriguez Park at Mark Light Field – Miami Hurricanes (baseball)
 Cobb Stadium - Miami Hurricanes (soccer, track and field)
 Tropical Park Stadium
 Homestead-Miami Speedway
 Calder Race Course
 Hialeah Park Race Track

Former venues include:
 Bobby Maduro Miami Stadium
 Miami Arena
 Miami Orange Bowl
 Miami Marine Stadium

Planned:
 Miami MLS stadium

Transportation

Airports

Miami International Airport, in an unincorporated area in the county, is the Miami area's primary international airport. One of the busiest international airports in the world, it serves over 35 million passengers a year. Identifiable locally, as well as several worldwide authorities, as MIA or KMIA, the airport is a major hub and the single largest international gateway for American Airlines, the world's largest passenger air carrier. Miami International is the United States’ third largest international port of entry for foreign air passengers (behind New York's John F. Kennedy International Airport and Los Angeles International Airport), and is the seventh largest such gateway in the world. The airport's extensive international route network includes non-stop flights to over seventy international cities in North and South America, Europe, Asia, and the Middle East.
 Homestead General Aviation Airport
 Miami Executive Airport
 Opa-Locka Executive
 Homestead Air Reserve Base, east of Homestead in an unincorporated area, serves military traffic.
 Miami Seaplane Base
 Dade-Collier

Public transit
Public transit in Miami-Dade County is operated by Miami-Dade Transit, and is the largest public transit in Florida. Miami-Dade Transit operates a heavy rail metro system Metrorail, an elevated people mover in Downtown Miami, Metromover and the bus system, Metrobus.

Brightline and Tri-Rail which are Inter-city rail also services the county.

Major expressways

Miami-Dade County has 10 major expressways and one minor expressway in Downtown Miami:

County roads
This is a list of Miami-Dade county roads. Miami-Dade County has fewer county roads than any other county in Florida, despite its large population. None are signed.

Sources:
 FDOT Map of Miami-Dade County, Florida
 FDOT GIS data, accessed January 2014

Street grid
A street grid stretches from downtown Miami throughout the county. This grid was adopted by the City of Miami following World War I after the United States Post Office threatened to cease mail deliveries in the city because the original system of named streets, with names often changing every few blocks and multiple streets in the city sharing the same name, was too confusing for the mail carriers. The new grid was later extended throughout the county as the population grew west, south, and north of city limits.

The grid is laid out with Miami Avenue as the meridian going north–south and Flagler Street the baseline going east-west. The grid is primarily numerical so that, for example, all street addresses north of Flagler and west of Miami Avenue have NW in their address (e.g. NW 27th Avenue). Because its point of origin is in downtown Miami which is close to the coast, the NW and SW quadrants are much larger than the SE and NE quadrants. Many roads, especially major ones, are also named, although, with a few notable exceptions, the number is in more common usage among locals.

Although this grid is easy to understand once one is oriented to it, it is not universal in the entire county. Hialeah uses its own grid system which is entirely different in its orientation. Coral Gables and Miami Lakes use named streets almost exclusively, and various smaller municipalities such as Florida City and Homestead use their own grid system along with the Miami-Dade grid system adding to the confusion. In the beach cities and parks of Miami Beach, Surfside, Bal Harbour, Sunny Isles, and Golden Beach, the streets are coordinated with the main grid; however, their avenues are named.

Communities

Notable people

Sister cities

Miami-Dade County's sister cities are:

 Aix-Marseille-Provence, France
 Province of Asti, Italy
 Asunción, Paraguay
 The Bahamas
 Cape Town, South Africa
 County Cork, Ireland
 Dakar, Senegal
 Kingston, Jamaica
 Maldonado, Uruguay
 Mendoza Province, Argentina
 Monagas State, Venezuela
 New Taipei, Taiwan
 Paramaribo, Suriname
 Pereira, Colombia
 Petit-Goâve, Haiti
 Prague, Czech Republic
 San José, Costa Rica
 Santo Domingo, Dominican Republic
 São Paulo, Brazil
 Stockholm County, Sweden
 Tenerife, Spain
 Veracruz, Mexico
 Viareggio, Italy
 Curitiba, Brazil

See also
 Gentrification of Miami
 List of tallest buildings in Miami
 List of tallest buildings in Sunny Isles Beach
 List of tallest buildings in Miami Beach
 National Register of Historic Places listings in Miami-Dade County, Florida
 List of counties in Florida
 West End (Florida)

References

External links

 

 
Counties in the Miami metropolitan area
Charter counties in Florida
1836 establishments in Florida Territory
Populated places established in 1836
Florida counties
Hispanic and Latino American culture in Florida